Roger Walker Evans (born December 3, 1938) is an American former professional off road racing driver and member of the Off-road Motorsports Hall of Fame. He was also a driver and owner in the NASCAR Craftsman Truck Series. Nicknamed "The Legend", he is the father of off-road racer Evan Evans. He resides in Riverside, California.

Racing career

Off-road

Born in Cedar Lake, Michigan, Evans began his off-road career in cross-country events in SCORE International events, including the premier event: the Baja 500. His first sample of racing was in 1969, when he drove a Rambler American for the American Motors and actor James Garner sponsored team to a third-place finish in the Baja 500. His first purpose built race truck was Ford F-100 donated by Marion Beaver at Parker Motor Company and built by Bill Stroppe. The truck won 16 of 17 races. He won the Baja 1000 five times.

He has 142 total victories and 21 championship titles in off-road desert and short course racing. He has multiple overall wins in the Baja 500, Baja 1000, Fireworks 250, Mint 400, and Parker 400.

He added the Mickey Thompson Entertainment Group Stadium Series events to his schedule to enhance his horizons. The series featured indoor races inside a stadium. The Walker Evans Racing Team won the MTEG Grand National Championship in 1999.
He won his first SODA race in 1986 at the Lake Geneva Raceway in Lake Geneva, Wisconsin. He won the 1994 and 1995 Class-8 (two-wheel drive) championships in SODA. He met fellow competitor Brendan Gaughan during his SODA days. He moved to CORR when most of the SODA drivers switched series. He finished with his SODA career with three overall victories and 31 class wins. He was champion of CORR's highest division, Pro-4, in 1999. He won three races and the CORR Pro-4 championship in 2000 in his final full-time season in CORR before retirement from short-track off-road racing.

Around 1999 he began entering rock crawling events after a promotional trip to Moab.

NASCAR

Racing
Evans decided to try his hand as a driver/owner in the newly formed NASCAR SuperTruck Series in 1995. He had one Top 10 finish in 18 races, and he finished 14th in the final points standings. He had three Top 10 finishes in 23 events in 1996, and he finished 17th in the overall points standings.

Team ownership
He continued his Walker Evans Racing team after his retirement. He hired former SODA and CORR competitor Brendan Gaughan to race for him in 2002. Gaughan won twice, on his way to the Rookie of the Year title. In 2003, Gaughan was the CTS points leader going into the final race, but was crashed out.

Halls of Fame
Evans was inducted in the Off-road Motorsports Hall of Fame in 2004. In 2015, he was inducted in the Motorsports Hall of Fame of America.  In 2022, he was inducted into the SEMA Hall Of Fame.

Motorsports career results

NASCAR
(key) (Bold – Pole position awarded by qualifying time. Italics – Pole position earned by points standings or practice time. * – Most laps led.)

Craftsman Truck Series

1 Ineligible for series points

References

External links
Official team website

Biography at off-road.com

1938 births
NASCAR drivers
NASCAR team owners
Living people
Racing drivers from Michigan
Off-road racing drivers